Fly pattern may refer to:
Fly route, also called a seam route, streak route or go route, a pattern run by a receiver in American and Canadian football, where the receiver runs straight upfield towards the endzone
Artificial fly or fly lure, a type of fishing lure, usually used in the sport of fly fishing and also used in other forms of angling